The national flag of Cameroon was adopted in its present form on 20 May 1975 after Cameroon became a unitary state. It is a vertical tricolour of green, red and yellow, with a five-pointed star in its center. There is a wide variation in the size of the central star, although it is always contained within the inside stripe.

Description
The colour scheme uses the traditional Pan-African colours (Cameroon was the second state to adopt them). The centre stripe is thought to stand for unity: red is the colour of unity, and the star is referred to as "the star of unity". The yellow stands for the sun, and also the savannas in the northern part of the country, while the green is for the forests in the southern part of Cameroon.

The previous flag of Cameroon, used from 1961 to 1975, had a similar colour scheme, but with two gold (darker than the third stripe by comparison) stars in the upper half of the green. It was adopted after British Southern Cameroons joined the state of Cameroon.

The original flag, made law by Law No. 46 of 26 October 1957, was the simple tricolour. It was confirmed  on 21 February 1960 in the new constitution.

Military flags and ensigns
Military flags and ensigns of Cameroon are following British practice with different designs.

Colors

Other flags

Similar colours
The flag of Cameroon uses the  Pan-African colors that is used by many African countries in the region, most notably with similar designs in the flags of Senegal, Guinea and Mali.

See also
Coat of arms of Cameroon
List of Cameroonian flags

References

External links

Cameroon
National symbols of Cameroon
Cameroon
Cameroon